Princess Deokon (Hangul: 덕온공주, Hanja: 德溫公主; 1822 - 1844) was the youngest daughter of Sunjo of Joseon and Queen Sunwon of the Andong Kim clan. She was the last Princess of Korea born to a King and Queen.

Biography
The Princess was born in 1822 as the youngest daughter of Sunjo of Joseon and Queen Sunwon of the Andong Kim clan. On 6 March 1829, at the age 8 years old, she was granted the title of Princess Deokon (덕온공주, 德溫公主).

Her father passed away on 13 December 1834, when she was 12 years old.

Three years later, on August 13 (during the reign of her nephew, Heonjong of Joseon), she married Yun Ui-seon (윤의선), son of Yun Chi-seung (윤치승). Her husband was later honoured as Prince Consort Namnyeong (남녕위).

Princess Deokon died 7 years after her marriage, on 1844, when she was 21 years old. It was said that she lost her life two hours after giving birth to a daughter, who also died soon after. Meanwhile, her husband, Yun Ui-seon, died in 1887 (24th year of Emperor Gojong's reign).

Others
The Princess' clothes and belongings were added to South Korea's Intangible Cultural Heritage, after they were collected by Seok Ju-seon (석주선). His Memorial Museum at Dankook University keeps 228 objects which belonged to the Princess and her descendants, in an exhibition called "The Last Princess of Joseon, The Relics of Princess Deokon" ('조선의 마지막 공주, 덕온가(家)의 유물전').

Family
Father: Sunjo of Joseon (29 July 1790 - 13 December 1834) (조선 순조왕)
Grandfather: Jeongjo of Joseon (28 October 1752 - 18 August 1800) (조선 정조왕)
Grandmother: Royal Noble Consort Su of the Bannam Park clan (8 May 1770 - 26 December 1822) (수빈 박씨)
Mother: Queen Sunwon of the Andong Kim clan (8 June 1789 - 21 September 1857) (순원왕후 김씨)
Grandfather: Kim Jo-sun (1765 - 1832) (김조순)
Grandmother: Internal Princess Consort Cheongyang of the Cheongsong Shim clan (1766 - 1828) (청양부부인 청송 심씨)
Siblings:
Older brother: Yi Yeong, Crown Prince Hyomyeong (18 September 1809 - 25 June 1830) (이영 효명세자)
Sister-in-law: Crown Princess Jo of the Pungyang Jo clan (21 January 1809 - 4 June 1890) (세자빈 조씨)
Nephew: Heonjong of Joseon (8 September 1827 - 25 July 1849) (조선 헌종왕)
Niece-in-law: Queen Hyohyeon of the Andong Kim clan (27 April 1828 - 18 October 1843) (효현왕후 김씨)
Niece-in-law: Queen Hyojeong of the Namyang Hong clan (6 March 1831 - 2 January 1904) (효정왕후 홍씨)
Older sister: Princess Myeongon (13 October 1810 - 13 June 1832) (명온공주)
Brother-in-law: Kim Hyeong-geun, Prince Consort Dongnyeong (1810 - 1868) (김현근 동녕위)
Adopted nephew: Kim Byeon-chan (김병찬)
Older sister: Princess Bokon (26 October 1818 - 12 May 1832) (복온공주)
Brother-in-law: Kim Byeon-ju, Prince Consort Changnyeong (1819 - 1853) (김병주 창녕위)
Husband:
 Yun Ui-seon, Prince Consort Namnyeong (? - 1887) (윤의선 남녕위, 南寧尉 尹宜善)
Father-in-law: Yun Chi-seung (윤치승, 尹致承)
Issue:
Daughter: Lady Yun (1844 - 1844)
 Adopted son: Yun Yong-gu (윤용구, 尹用求) (1853 - 1939)

References

1822 births
1844 deaths
Princesses of Joseon
19th-century Korean people
19th-century Korean women